The Pickering Operations Complex is a  skyscraper at 20 Pickering Street, in Raffles Place in the central business district of Singapore. The tower is situated adjacent to OCBC Centre and One George Street.

History 
Pickering Operations Complex was designed by Kenzo Tange Associates, and was completed in 1986. Other companies involved in the development of Pickering Operations Complex included Singapore Telecommunications Limited, Meinhardt (Singapore) Private Limited, Meinhardt (Singapore) Private Limited, and Meinhardt (Singapore) Private Limited.

Architecture 
Pickering Operations Complex is mainly made out of reinforced concrete. The architecture of the building bears much similarity to OCBC Centre, which was completed one decade earlier. In fact, the OCBC centre is situated just next to Pickering Operations Complex.

Facilities and equipment 
Designed as a Telecom hotel or co-location facility, Pickering Operations Complex naturally has many technical equipment that cater to telecommunications. There are two "technical floors" in the building, the 5th and the 29th floor. The tower is one of many buildings and trunk exchange centres that belong to Singtel. However, it is Singtel's only building that is in the central business district, Raffles Place.

The building uses the SAUTER EY3600 building management system, which is equipped with the SAUTER novaPro Open management level. The automation stations of the nova family, monitors and controls the mechanical ventilation for the air conditioning system and the lighting. The fire-alarm system, the lifts, the lowvoltage system, the emergency power system and the sanitary facilities are also monitored and controlled by the SAUTER EY3600.

Technical equipment 
The building's technical equipment comprises:
 8 refrigeration plants, each with a capacity of 300 tons
 24 air-handling units
 14 fan-coil units
 16 control centres on various floors
 77 air-conditioning systems for the EDP rooms

See also 
 List of tallest buildings in Singapore

References 

Commercial buildings completed in 1986
Downtown Core (Singapore)
Skyscraper office buildings in Singapore
Raffles Place
20th-century architecture in Singapore